Stan Cutler is an American screenwriter.

Born in Newark, New Jersey. Cutler began his career in 1957, first writing for the NBC Matinee Theater. He then wrote episodes for television programs, such as, That Girl, The Partridge Family, Occasional Wife, The Second Hundred Years, 9 to 5 and The Courtship of Eddie's Father. Cutler had written 26 episodes for the sitcom television series The Farmer's Daughter. In 1976, he served as the developer for the new NBC sitcom television series Snip. His last screenwriting credit was from Small Wonder. After retiring, he wrote books for the Mark Bradley and Rayford Goodman series, in which was published by E. P. Dutton.

Cutler lived in Los Angeles, California with his wife.

References

External links 

Possibly living people
Year of birth missing (living people)
People from Newark, New Jersey
Screenwriters from New Jersey
American male screenwriters
American television writers
American male television writers
20th-century American screenwriters
American fiction writers